Synagogue of the Ashkenazi Jews in Baku is a synagogue in Baku. It is located in the center of the city.

History
In 1946, a building of former depot of the civil defense on the corner of Korganov (now Rasul Rza) and Pervomayskaya (now Dilara Aliyeva) Streets in a semi-basement place was allocated for the present synagogue. The building was repaired and re-equipped for needs of communities together with a community of Georgian Jews of Azerbaijan. Two praying halls were built there: a big one for the Ashkenazi Jews and a small one for Georgian Jews. Means were collected in the result of voluntary donations donated by Azerbaijani Jews. In 2002, it was decided to build a new building for the synagogue. Opening of the new synagogue was held on March 9, 2003.

At present, Rabbi Shneor Segal, leader of Alliance of Rabbis in Islamic States is the Chief Rabbi of the synagogue and the Ashkenazi community.

References

1946 establishments in Azerbaijan
Ashkenazi Jewish culture in Asia
Synagogues completed in 1946
Synagogues completed in 2003
Ashkenazi synagogues
Religious buildings and structures in Azerbaijan
Synagogues in Asia
Synagogues in Azerbaijan
Buildings and structures in Baku
Culture in Baku
Tourist attractions in Azerbaijan